Pape Hamadou (or Amadou) N'Diaye (born July 24, 1977) is a Senegalese professional footballer who played as a defender. Having begun his career with Port Autonome, he moved to France in 2011 to play on the professional level in Ligue 2 for Grenoble Foot 38. He ended his career with Championnat de France amateur side AS Cherbourg Football.

External links
 

1977 births
Living people
Association football defenders
Senegalese footballers
Senegal international footballers
2000 African Cup of Nations players
Senegalese expatriate footballers
Expatriate footballers in France
Ligue 2 players
Port Autonome players
Grenoble Foot 38 players
AS Cherbourg Football players